Euageta is a monotypic snout moth genus described by Alfred Jefferis Turner in 1947. Its one species, Euageta dianipha, described by Oswald Bertram Lower in 1902, is known from Australia.

References

Cabniini
Monotypic moth genera
Moths of Australia
Pyralidae genera